The 1904 International Cross Country Championships was held in St Helens, England, at the Haydock Park Racecourse on 26 March 1904. 
A report on the event was given in the Glasgow Herald.
Complete results, medallists, 
 and the results of British athletes were published.

Medallists

Individual Race Results

Men's (8.5 mi / 13.7 km)

Team Results

Men's

Participation
An unofficial count yields the participation of 46 athletes from 4 countries.

 (12)
 (10)
 (12)
 (12)

References

International Cross Country Championships
International Cross Country Championships
Cross
International Cross Country Championships
Cross country running in the United Kingdom
1900s in Lancashire
International Cross Country Championships
Sport in St Helens, Merseyside